Williams Bay High School is a 4-year public high school located in Williams Bay, Wisconsin. School enrollment is approximately 181 students. The school district serves the village of Williams Bay, and the towns of Delavan, Linn, Walworth, and Geneva.

History 
Following the school shooting at Columbine High School, Williams Bay High School took part in a simulated school shooting to train local law enforcement. The drill was filmed and along with interviews of school officials and community members was shown on the NBC Nightly News with Tom Brokaw.

Academics 
Williams Bay High School is renowned for their rigorous courses that are designed to prepare students for college. For a small school WBHS has a wide selection of AP and honors classes furthering that goal. For students who may not be college bound, or are simply interested WBHS also offers a fair selection of electives. These electives range from technical education classes, to Family and Consumer Education (FACE) classes, and a good distribution of art classes.

Extracurricular activities

Athletics 
The WBHS sports teams are nicknamed the "Bulldogs" and sport the school colors orange and black. The Bulldogs compete in WIAA Division 4 in the Trailways Conference. The girls' volleyball team won the state championship in 2003, 2004, and 2005, and were runners up in 2002. The softball team won the state championship in 2007 and took the conference title in 2008. In football the Bulldogs compete in the Trailways Small School division, and are a WIAA division 7 program.
WBHS teams up with Big Foot High School for boys' and girls' soccer, boys' wrestling, equestrian, and boys' and girls' tennis. The Bay also teams up with Badger High School in Lake Geneva for boys' and girls' swim and boy's and girls' skiing.

Recognition 
In 2014, Newsweek ranked Williams Bay High School #1 in the country.

References

External links
Williams Bay Middle / High School

	

Public high schools in Wisconsin
Schools in Walworth County, Wisconsin